"Dangerous Type" is a 1979 song by the Cars from their second studio album, Candy-O. It was written by Ric Ocasek.

Background
The core guitar riff that "Dangerous Type" is centered on resembles the T. Rex song, "Bang a Gong". The song features Ric Ocasek on lead vocals. AllMusic critic Tom Maginnis compared the song to "All Mixed Up", a track on The Cars' self-titled debut album, as they both were the final track on their respective albums, with both tracks "vamping on an upsweep of grand chord changes as the group's entire sonic palette eventually fills the tape to capacity for the big finish."

Although "Dangerous Type" never was released as a single, the song has since become a fan favorite. It has appeared on numerous compilation albums, among them Just What I Needed: The Cars Anthology and Complete Greatest Hits.

Reception
"Dangerous Type" has received positive reception from music critics. AllMusic critic Greg Prato said it was one of the "plenty of other standouts [besides "Let's Go" on Candy-O that] can be found" and cited the track as a highlight from Candy-O. Tom Maginnis said, "'Dangerous Type' is the Cars' idea of a musical epic", and went on to say, "After the impossibly infectious leadoff single 'Let's Go,' 'Dangerous Type' would become the album's second-biggest hit." In the Just What I Needed: The Cars Anthology liner notes, Brett Milano said, "'Let's Go' and 'Dangerous Type' [stood] out as the best of [Ric] Ocasek's enigmatic-woman songs."

Covers
In 1996, Letters to Cleo recorded a cover of "Dangerous Type" for the movie, The Craft.
The song was covered by Johnny Monaco for the tribute album Substitution Mass Confusion: A Tribute to The Cars.

Personnel
Ric Ocasek: rhythm guitar, lead vocals
Benjamin Orr: bass guitar, backing vocals
Elliot Easton: lead guitar, backing vocals
Greg Hawkes: keyboards, backing vocals
David Robinson: drums

References

External links
 

The Cars songs
Songs written by Ric Ocasek
Song recordings produced by Roy Thomas Baker
1979 songs